New Age Steppers were a dub collective from the United Kingdom, formed by producer Adrian Sherwood and featuring members of various prominent 1970s UK post-punk groups, including Ari Up and Viv Albertine of the Slits, Mark Stewart and Bruce Smith of The Pop Group, Keith Levene of Public Image Ltd, John Waddington of Rip Rig + Panic, and Vicky Aspinall of The Raincoats. Other musicians included associates of Sherwood's On-U Sound label, including George Oban, Bim Sherman, Style Scott, and Eskimo Fox.

History
New Age Steppers released the self-titled debut album on On-U Sound in 1980. It was followed by Action Battlefield in 1981. The third album, Foundation Steppers, was released in 1982.

Love Forever, an album of songs which the late Ari Up and Adrian Sherwood had recorded together until the death of Ari Up, was released in 2012.

Style and influences
John Dougan of Allmusic said, "the sound of the New Age Steppers was that of cut-and-paste dub mixing, psychedelic swirls of found sounds, dissonant aural collages, sinewy reggae riddims, and odd, semi-tuneful vocals."

Discography

Studio albums
The New Age Steppers (1980)
Action Battlefield (1981)
Foundation Steppers (1982)
Love Forever (2012)

Compilation albums
Crucial Ninety (1981)
Massive Hits Vol. 1 (1994)
Trifecta (2011)
Stepping into a New Age Box Set (2021)

Singles
"Fade Away" (1980)
"My Love" (1981)
"My Nerves (Punk)" (2012)

References

External links

interview with New Age Steppers' drummer, Eskimo Fox

Dub musical groups
On-U Sound Records artists
English post-punk music groups
British reggae musical groups
1980 establishments in England
Musical groups established in 1980
2012 disestablishments in England
Musical groups disestablished in 2012
Musical collectives